Newton Morrell is a village and civil parish in the Richmondshire district of North Yorkshire, England.

The village was described in the Domesday Book as belong to Count Alan and in the manor of Gilling. The name of the village derives from a combination of Old English (nīwe tūn) and a family surname of Morrell (from Old French meaning "dark and husky").

At the 2011 Census the population of the civil parish was less than 100. Information regarding this population is included in the parish of Cleasby. The village is very near Barton and Stapleton.

Just to the south of the village is what has been designated as a medieval shrunken village. Earthworks are also present at this site.

References

External links

Village website

Villages in North Yorkshire
Civil parishes in North Yorkshire